Bristowia is a genus of spiders in the jumping spider family, Salticidae, found in Africa and Asia.

B. heterospinosa is about 3 to 4 mm long in both sexes.

Name
The genus is named after naturalist and arachnologist W. S. Bristowe.

Species
, the World Spider Catalog accepted the following species:
 Bristowia afra Szűts, 2004 — Congo basin
 Bristowia gandhii Kanesharatnam & Benjamin, 2016 — Sri Lanka
 Bristowia heterospinosa Reimoser, 1934 — India, China, Korea, Vietnam, Japan, Krakatau

References

Bibliography
 Szűts, T. (2004). "A revision of the genus Bristowia (Araneae: Salticidae)". Folia entomologica hungarica 65: 25-31. PDF

Salticidae genera
Spiders of Asia
Spiders of Africa
Salticidae